Hilde Sejersted, née Robberstad (born 19 May 1941) is a Norwegian philologist and teacher.

She spent her professional career as a teacher in history, Latin and Norwegian at Oslo Cathedral School from 1968 to 2008. She has also released two books Om Garman & Worse (1996) and Latinen lenge leve. Sitater og bevingede ord (2011, with Vibeke Roggen). She is a member of the Norwegian Academy for Language and Literature.

In 1964 she married Francis Sejersted, later history professor and chair of the Nobel Committee. They resided at Abbediengen.

References 

1941 births
Living people
Norwegian philologists
Women philologists
Norwegian schoolteachers
Members of the Norwegian Academy